Stéphanie Fotso Mogoung (born ) is a Cameroonian volleyball player. She is a member of the Cameroon women's national volleyball team and played for VBC Chamalières in 2014. 

She was part of the Cameroonian national team at the 2014 FIVB Volleyball Women's World Championship in Italy and at the 2016 Olympic Games in Rio de Janeiro.

Clubs
  VBC Chamalières (2014)

References

External links
http://www.rfi.fr/sports/20150915-jeux-africains-2015-douze-mois-travaux-stephanie-fotso-volley-ball-cameroun-chamalie
http://www.zimbio.com/photos/Stephanie+Fotso+Mogoung/Volleyball+Olympics+Day+3/h4e0fVQV4FC

1987 births
Living people
Cameroonian women's volleyball players
Place of birth missing (living people)
Olympic volleyball players of Cameroon
Volleyball players at the 2016 Summer Olympics
Middle blockers
21st-century Cameroonian women